Glen Check (Hangul: 글렌체크) is a South Korean indie band, consisting of singer and guitarist Kim June-one, and bassist and synthesizer player Kang Hyuk-jun. They debuted in 2011 with the EP Disco Elevator, and released their first full-length album, Haute Couture, in 2012.

History 
Kim June-one (Hangul: 김준원) and Kang Hyuk-jun (Hangul: 강혁준) were both born in South Korea, but spent much of their childhoods abroad, listening mostly to Western music. They met after returning to South Korea, while attending Busan International High School, where they decided to pursue music as a career. After graduation, they formed a band called The Closure, which Kim later described as being "quiet and boring."

They changed the band's name to Glen Check, and began releasing electropop and synth-pop music, starting with their first EP, 2011's Disco Elevator. Their first full-length album, 2012's Haute Couture, was met with rave reviews from critics, and won Best Dance & Electronic Album at the 2013 Korean Music Awards. The band's second album, 2013's Youth!, also won Best Dance & Electronic Album the following year at the 2014 Korean Music Awards, and Billboard called the album track "Young Generation" one of the best South Korean songs of 2013.

In 2014, Glen Check performed at the South by Southwest music festival as part of a Korean rock showcase. That same year, Melissa Locker of Time singled out Glen Check as her favorite band from South Korea, praising their "edgy '80s energy" and "style that's nearly impossible not to dance to."

In 2017, the band released its first album in four years, the EP The Glen Check Experience. The album was a departure from their synth-pop sound and featured genres including psychedelic rock, old school hip hop, acid jazz, and techno. The album charted at number 38 on South Korea's Gaon Album Chart. Billboard named it as one of the twenty best South Korean albums of the year and described it as "perhaps the most sonically adventurous album on the list." On 3 August 2018, the band released the track "Velvet Goldmine".

They released the single Dive Baby, Dive on 13 September 2021. This was followed by the release of the song "Raving" and the announcement of a new album, Bleach, expected to be released on 5 March 2022.

Artistry 
Glen Check is notable for only singing in English. While the duo have cited Western music as being an influence on them, they were also inspired by African music and traditional Korean music on their album Haute Couture. For Cliché, they looked to funk and disco music from the 1970s and 1980s for their inspiration. The duo has said that they do not want their sound to be limited, and that they plan to experiment in many different styles. The band places an emphasis on the visual aspects of their live shows and have been noted for their stage design.

Discography

Studio albums

Extended plays

Remix albums

Awards

Korean Music Awards

References

External links
Glen Check's page on Soundcloud
Glen Check's Instagram

Glen Check's page on Spotify
June-one's website
June-one's page on Soundcloud
June-one's Instagram
June-one' channel on YouTube
June-one's page on Spotify

South Korean indie rock groups
South Korean electronic music groups
South Korean synthpop groups
South Korean musical duos
Korean Music Award winners